Beata Obertyńska, (pen name "Marta Rudzka"), born July 18, 1898, near Skole (in present-day Western Ukraine), died May 21, 1980 in London was a Polish writer and poet.

Life
Beata was one of the daughters of the 'Young Poland' poet Maryla Wolska and granddaughter of the sculptor :pl:Wanda Młodnicka (one-time fiancée of painter, Artur Grottger). Her father was an engineer and industrialist in the oil business, :pl:Wacław Wolski (inżynier). She was the wife of landowner, Józef Obertyński.

She spent her childhood and adolescence with her siblings in the family villa in Lwów where they were home-tutored. She later passed her high school exams. In her youth she was associated with the Skamander movement.

Her first poems were published in 1924 in "Słowo Polskie". She studied in the National Institute of Theatre Arts. Between 1933 and 1937 she appeared on stage in several Lwów theatres.

During the Soviet occupation of Lwów, in July 1940, she was arrested by the NKVD. She was imprisoned in the infamous Brygidki prison and was later moved to prisons in Kyiv, Odessa, Kharkiv, Starobielsk and finally to the Vorkuta concentration camp. In 1942, following the Sikorski-Mayski Agreement, she was released and joined Anders'army. She served through all of its campaigns in Iran, Palestine, Egypt and Italy.

After the war she settled in London and published in Polish-language publications; "Dziennik Polski", "Dziennik Żołnierza", "Orzeł Biały", "Polska Walcząca", "Ochotniczka", "Wiadomości", "Życie", and "Przegląd Polski". She was a laureate of several literary awards, among them the award of the London-based "Przegląd Powszechny" (1967) and of the Lanckoroński Foundation (1972), the award of The Polish Ex-Combatants Association (1972) and the Jurzykowski Prize (1974).

Her younger sister, 'Lela' (Aniela), married the diplomat and writer, Michał Pawlikowski. They too settled in London after the war. Lela was a sought-after portrait painter and produced a portrait of Diana, Princess of Wales, as a child.

Beata collapsed on a bus in Putney High Street and died in 1980 in London.

Major works

Poems
 Pszczoły w słoneczniku (1927, "Bees in the sunflower")
 Głóg przydrożny (1932, "Hawthorn by the roadside"),
 Otawa. Wiersze dawne i nowe (Jerozolima 1945, "Ottawa. New and Old Poems"),
 Miód i piołun (Londyn 1972, "Honey and Wormwood"),
 Anioł w knajpie (Londyn 1977, "The Angel at the bar"),
 Perły – wiersze (Brighton 1980, "Pearls - poems"),
 Wiersze wybrane (1983, "Selected poems")
 Grudki kadzidła (Londyn, Kraków 1987, "Crumbs of resin")
 Skrząca libella (1991)
 Liryki najpiękniejsze (1999, "Beautiful lyrics")

Novels and memories
 Gitara i tamci (1926, "They and the guitar")
 Wspomnienia (Quodlibet, 1974, memoirs, together with her mother, Maryla Wolska)
 W domu niewoli (Rzym 1946, "In the house of slavery")
 Skarb Eulenburga (tom 1-2, Londyn 1987-1988, "Eulenburgh's treasure").

See also
Herminia Naglerowa

1898 births
1980 deaths
Foreign Gulag detainees
Polish women poets
Polish deportees to Soviet Union
Polish people detained by the NKVD
20th-century Polish poets
20th-century women writers
Polish emigrants to the United Kingdom
20th-century Polish women